Thomas Lee Holland (born July 11, 1943) is an American screenwriter, actor, and director best known for his work in the horror film genre, penning the 1983 sequel to the classic Alfred Hitchcock film Psycho, directing and co-writing the first entry in the long-running Child's Play franchise, and writing and directing the cult vampire film Fright Night. He also directed the Stephen King adaptations The Langoliers and Thinner. He is a two-time Saturn Award recipient. Holland made the jump into children’s literature in 2018 when he co-wrote How to Scare a Monster with fellow writer Dustin Warburton.

Early life and education
Holland was born July 11, 1943, in Poughkeepsie, New York, to Lee and Tom Holland. He attended Ossining Public High School in Ossining, New York before transferring to Worcester Academy, where he graduated in 1962. After graduating high school, Holland attended Northwestern University for one year before transferring to the University of California, Los Angeles, where he graduated in 1970. He later graduated from UCLA Law School with a Juris Doctor.

Career

Acting career
Holland trained as an actor at the Actors Studio under Lee Strasberg. Throughout the 60s and early 70s Holland appeared under the moniker of Tom Fielding in several supporting and guest star roles for both television and film, including A Walk in the Spring Rain alongside Anthony Quinn and Ingrid Bergman.

In December 2009 Holland was cast for Adam Green's Hatchet II, to star alongside Danielle Harris, Tony Todd, Kane Hodder, and R.A. Mihailoff. He narrated the film alongside Green on San Diego Comic-Con International 2010.

Writing 
Holland made his screenwriting debut with the 1978 made-for-television film The Initiation of Sarah. He made his feature film writing debut in 1982, adapting the Edward Levy novel The Beast Within into the film of the same title. That same year, he wrote Class of 1984, an urban thriller film centered on juvenile delinquency and punk subculture. The film proved controversial upon release and was heavily censored in the United Kingdom and outright banned in other countries. It has since become a cult classic.

Holland was hired by Universal Pictures to write a sequel to the 1960 Alfred Hitchcock film Psycho, which since its initial release had been acclaimed as not only a seminal and iconic horror film, but one of the greatest films of all time. Lead actor Anthony Perkins, who had previously displayed apprehension at appearing in a sequel, agreed to do the film after being impressed by Holland's screenplay. The film, directed by Richard Franklin and co-starring Meg Tilly, Robert Loggia, and Dennis Franz, opened at No. 2 at the box office (behind Return of the Jedi) and went on to gross $34 million.

Holland re-teamed with director Franklin the following year on his next film, Cloak & Dagger. Unlike their previous film, Cloak & Dagger was a spy film aimed at a younger audience, and starring Henry Thomas of E.T. the Extra-Terrestrial in its leading role. Despite positive critical reviews, the film was a financial failure, grossing $9,719,952 off of a 13 million dollar production budget.

Directing 
Holland's directorial debut came in 1985 with the vampire horror film Fright Night. Holland first conceived of the premise during the writing of Cloak & Dagger, of a horror film fan who learns that his neighbor is a vampire. He chose to direct the film himself after being disappointed with Michael Winner's direction of his screenplay Scream for Help. The film was both financial and critical success, earning a rave review from Roger Ebert who wrote "Fright Night is not a distinguished movie, but it has a lot of fun being undistinguished." The film spawned a sequel in 1988 titled Fright Night Part 2, and a 2011 remake, Fright Night starring Colin Farrell and Anton Yelchin. That remake also had its own sequel, Fright Night 2: New Blood, which was released in 2013. Holland wasn't involved in any of the sequels or the remake. On October 28, 2020, Holland confirmed that he is writing a direct sequel to the original Fright Night titled Fright Night: Resurrection and that his sequel would ignore the 1988 sequel and be a proper sequel to his 1985 film.

In 1988, Holland directed the film Child's Play, which received positive reviews from Ebert and Leonard Maltin, spawned a long-running franchise consisting of six sequels, and helped elevate its antagonist Chucky to a pop culture icon. He directed three episodes of the horror anthology series Tales from the Crypt, and returned to television films with The Stranger Within. He wrote and directed a 1996 ABC miniseries adaptation of the Stephen King novella The Langoliers, and the following year adapted King's novel Thinner into a film of the same title.

Dead Rabbit Films
He and David Chackler founded the horror film company Dead Rabbit Films in 2009. Holland wrote and directed a horror anthology webseries titled Twisted Tales, which appeared on Fearnet in 2013 and was released on home media in 2014.

Personal life
He is the father of American actor Josh Holland.

Filmography

Film

Filmmaking credits

Executive producer

Acting credits

Television and web

Filmmaking credits

Acting credits

Critical reception

Awards and nominations

References

External links
 

1943 births
Worcester Academy alumni
American male film actors
Screenwriters from New York (state)
Horror film directors
Living people
Writers from Poughkeepsie, New York
UCLA School of Law alumni
California lawyers
Film directors from New York (state)